The 1881 Ohio gubernatorial election was held on October 11, 1881. Incumbent Republican Charles Foster defeated Democratic nominee John W. Bookwalter with 50.10% of the vote.

General election

Candidates
Major party candidates
Charles Foster, Republican 
John W. Bookwalter, Democratic

Other candidates
Abraham R. Ludlow, Prohibition
John J. Seitz, People's

Results

References

1881
Ohio